Hemlock Bluffs Nature Preserve is a joint project between the North Carolina state park system and the Town of Cary in Wake County, North Carolina in the United States. The state owns  of the preserve, known as Hemlock Bluffs State Natural Area. The preserve protects a population of Eastern Hemlock trees and other vegetation more typically found further west, in the Appalachian Mountains. The tall, north-facing bluffs of Swift Creek provide conditions similar enough to the mountains to have allowed the plant communities to have survived there since the last ice age.

The Stevens Nature Center is a nature center located on Cary's portion of the preserve, which provides the preserve's core visitor facilities. It provides information about the natural history of the area and the plants and animals that live in the Nature Preserve.

Hiking Trails 
The preserve has approximately 3 miles of mulched hiking trails featuring boardwalks, benches, stairs, and overlooks.

References

External links
 Friends of Hemlock Bluffs
 Hemlock Bluffs Nature Preserve Trail Map
 Hemlock Bluffs Nature Preserve
 Stevens Nature Center
 Harold D. Ritter Park is adjacent to the preserve's northern boundary.

State parks of North Carolina
Protected areas of Wake County, North Carolina
Geography of Cary, North Carolina
Protected areas established in 1976
Nature centers in North Carolina
Nature reserves in North Carolina